Edgware is a suburban town in northern Greater London, mostly in the London Borough of Barnet but with small parts falling in the London Borough of Harrow and in the London Borough of Brent. Edgware has a generally suburban character, typical of the rural-urban fringe. It was an ancient parish in the county of Middlesex directly east of the ancient Watling Street, and gives its name to the present day Edgware Road that runs from central London towards the town. The community benefits from some elevated woodland on a high ridge marking the Hertfordshire border of gravel and sand. It includes the areas of Burnt Oak, The Hale, Edgwarebury, Canons Park, and parts of Queensbury.

Edgware is principally a shopping and residential area, identified in the London Plan as one of the capital's 35 major centres, and one of the northern termini of the Northern line. It has a bus garage, a shopping centre called the Broadwalk Centre, a library, a community hospital—Edgware Community Hospital, and two streams—Edgware Brook and Deans Brook, both tributaries of a small brook known as Silk Stream, which in turn merges with the River Brent at Brent Reservoir.

As of 2011, the town had a population of 76,506 and is made up of five wards from both Barnet and Harrow boroughs.

History

It succeeds to the identity of the ancient parish in the county of Middlesex. Edgware is a Saxon name meaning Ecgi's weir. Ecgi was a Saxon and the weir relates to a pond where Ecgi's people caught fish. Edgware parish formed part of Hendon Rural District from 1894. It was abolished in 1931 and formed part of the Municipal Borough of Hendon until 1965. The Romans made pottery at Brockley Hill, thought by some to be the site of Sulloniacis. Canons Park, to the north-west, was developed as an estate by James Brydges, 1st Duke of Chandos and was the site of his great palace Cannons.

Origins and pre-industrial history
Edgware's early history is inferred from its Saxon place name and recorded variants. It means "Ecgi's weir". Ecgi is a Saxon name and the weir relates to a pond where his people would catch fish. A legal record of 1422 mentions "Eggeswer", in Middlesex, which, being in Latin, may have been written deliberately using an older form of the spelling. Over many years the name slowly became Edgware, and Ecgi as an individual is long since forgotten. By 1489, and the beginning of the Tudor period those writing the name added the "d" and it was Edggeware.

The manor does not appear in the Domesday survey, nor has there ever been a manor-house as such. But its centre has traditionally always been  since at least 1216.  James Brydges, 1st Duke of Chandos erected a palace at Cannons Park around 1713 for £250,000 and was by far the wealthiest resident in its pre-20th century history. The ancient parish served by St Margaret's church was larger than the manor and included parts of Elstree in the north, but not land south of Deans Brook and Edgware Brook, or Little Stanmore parish west of the Edgware Road marking a traditional longest boundary of Edgware.  The area of Edgware was little altered and was in the 1930s .

Edgware Road follows the same line as the ancient Watling Street, an important Roman Road, and used in the medieval period by pilgrims.  The Road was improved by the Edgware-Kilburn turnpike trust in 1711, and a number of the local inns functioned as a stop for coaches. By 1867 a railway line had been built between Edgware and Finsbury Park and a station was built.

Mostly forest until the 13th century the area was mixed agriculture until the end of 16th century. Production of hay and the selling of cattle fattened and driven from other parts of England and sold locally led, by the 17th century to Edgware becoming a small market. Trades included butchers, tailors, colliers (charcoal sellers) and brewers. The market was held every week but petered out in 1790s.

Edgware was associated with the highwayman Dick Turpin- the infamous scene of his worst incident, which happened on 4 February 1735, when five gang members, including Turpin, broke into a farmhouse owned by Joseph Lawrence, called Earlsbury Farm. Lawrence was at least 70 (so considered fairly old) and yet Turpin et al. beat him with their pistols and tortured him by setting him on a fire whilst naked, before announcing that they would amputate his legs. While this was going on, the leader of the gang took a servant girl upstairs and raped her.

Early economic history
Industry played a minor role in the economy of Edgware. There was a cattle and pleasure fair from 1760s to 1860s with horse racing between 1834 and 1855.

Gravel pits were probably being worked by 1802 and certainly by 1834, partly at least by the labour of the able-bodied poor as a parish employment, and in 1963 gravel was still being extracted on the eastern side of the parish. In 1831 there were no persons engaged in manufacturing in the parish, and in fact there were no industries until in 1900 the firm of Chas. Wright Ltd., manufacturing engineers, moved from Clerkenwell: employed for the UK government in World War I and after this it struck 2,000,000 Mons or 1914 Stars and Victory Medals. Its largest production in World War II was for the metal parts of respirator filters: making 94½ million between 1937 and 1943. In 1963 the company was chiefly engaged in the manufacture of car registration plates. There were 70 workmen employed, together with an office staff of 30. The firm of A.E.W. Ltd., founded in 1923 and established in Edgware in 1927, at the start of the 1970s employed 50 people and manufactured laboratory and industrial electric ovens and furnaces.

Edgware had few residents for its size but saw some prosperous commerce: in 1870, for instance, there were six insurance agents in the village. The opening of the Great Northern Railway branch in 1867, however, seems to have had little effect on the expansion of the village, and plans to extend the railway met with strong local opposition. A Bill to establish a line from Watford to Edgware, brought before Parliament in 1896 and 1897, was opposed by residents, and it was said that the real harm of the railways was the opening up of building sites 'which are quickly covered with architectural atrocities'.  In this time the parish had begun to display a tendency to split into an opulent north and a workaday south, separated by an agricultural buffer zone. By 1896 several large houses had been built in the Elstree area or along the Elstree—Barnet road, while the old village gained the post office, the infants' school, the station, and the Railway Hotel. The southern part of the parish was unable to repel the tide of suburban development, but the threatened distinction was to a large extent averted by the quality of buildings between the two world wars.

Suburban transformation

The first (non-tube connected) railway accompanied a brief decline in population. By the mid 19th century the area was almost entirely for the purpose of hay production.  In 1939 the overground railway passenger service ceased to run, and goods traffic ceased by 1964.  A tram service began in 1904. In 1921 the population was 1,516. Although much suburban development was encouraged by the opening of the tube station in 1924, the area was already attracting developers like George Cross to the area by 1919. The conurbation increased as far north as the Edgware Way. In 1932 the parish became a part of Hendon Urban District. The shopping district around Station Road developed to include the Ritz Cinema, which opened in May 1932.  Following several name changes the cinema was eventually demolished in 2001 replaced by a large gym, apartments and a Caffe Nero. The Edgware Town F.C. was founded in 1939 after a predecessor team in 1915.

A general hospital on Burnt Oak Broadway dates back to an infirmary that was added at a workhouse from the Hendon Board of Guardians in 1865, with an all new site adjacent to it built and opened with 175 beds in December 1927 as Redhill Hospital. It was extended greatly by Middlesex County Council in the late 1930s. It became part of the National Health Service in 1948 and renamed Edgware General Hospital.

Post-war development has been restricted by the Metropolitan Green Belt, sparing urban sprawl into the Scratch Wood and Deacons Hill areas apart from the M1 motorway. By this time the population was more than 17,000. The Mall Shopping Centre, formerly Broadwalk Shopping Centre, replaced the station pulled down in 1961, in 1990.

Following a review in 1994, Edgware General Hospital was controversially closed by the Conservative government of John Major in April 1997 despite public opposition. After the Labour Party election victory the closure was upheld, leading to further outcry from the public. Eventually a review and lengthy consultations took place with local campaigners and authorities which resulted in the building of a community hospital. The General Hospital site was demolished and Edgware Community Hospital opened in its place in February 2005, which cost £38 million.

Edgware was identified in 2008 as a major centre for preferred development in the London Plan.

In the mid 2010s, many new apartments have been built on Green Lane.

Geography
Much of Edgware is steep, particularly around Edgwarebury Park (a Site of Nature Conservation Interest) and the Broadfields Estate.

The Edgwarebury Brook, Deans Brook and Edgware Brook all flow in the area, all tributaries of the River Brent. Notable open spaces are Edgwarebury Park, Stoneyfields Park and Watling Park.

The A41 road (Watford Bypass) runs through Edgware as well as the M1 motorway.

Edgware is divided between the HA and NW postcode areas.

Demography and religion

Until the 20th century there were no major rises in the population of Edgware. In the manor of Edgware in 1277 there were eight free tenants (excluding the Grand Priory of Clerkenwell) and 52 customary tenants (assumed to all be men); the survey from which these figures are taken, however, includes lands appurtenant to the manor lying in Kingsbury. In 1425–26 the manor of Edgware had three free and 29 customary tenants in the parish, and in 1525–26 the numbers were two or three free and 26 customary tenants. In 1547 there were 120 (adult or teenage) communicants in the parish. In 1597 there were between 60 and 70 houses in the parish, and 44 more in the village of Edgware but on the west side of Watling Street and therefore in the parish of Little Stanmore. In 1599 there were six free and 25 customary tenants of the manor within Edgware. In 1642 in the Civil War the protestation oath of 1641 was taken by 103 adult males. In 1664 there were 73 houses in the parish, but the hearth tax of 1672 gives only 66. During the 18th century the average numbers both of baptisms and burials declined gently but steadily; in the period 1717–26 the average number of baptisms was between 15 and 16 a year and the average number of burials 20, but by 1801–10 the figures were 11 and 9, respectively.  There were said to be 69 houses in the village in 1766 and 76 houses in 1792. At the first census in 1801 the population was 412. Throughout the 19th century numbers rose slowly, except for the years between 1851 and 1871; the censuses of 1861 and 1871 show successive declines of 7 percent, attributed in 1871 to migration and to the absence of direct trains to London.

Ten years later the losses had been more than made good, and in 1901 the figure of 868 had been reached. By 1921 the population had grown to 1,516, but the great infilling of the southern part of Edgware after 1924 caused the most spectacular increase. In 1931 the population was 5,352; this had increased to 17,513 by 1951 and to 20,127 by 1961.

As well as Christian and subsequent settling of other religious groups, Edgware's development coincided with that of its Jewish community, currently forming the largest single religious group. In the 2001 Census, 36% of Edgware residents give their religion as Jewish, 28% Christian, 9% Hindu and 5% Muslim. The Jewish community in Edgware has constructed its own Eruv.

Edgware has a strong Jewish character, and also has significant Hindu and Muslim minorities, mostly of Indian origin.

According to the 2011 census:

Edgware ward of Barnet was 60% white (47% British, 12% Other White, 1% Irish). 13% was Indian and 7% Black African. 33% of the population was Jewish, 28% Christian and 11% Muslim. The most spoken foreign language is Gujarati.
Hale ward of Barnet (east from the centre) was 59% white (45% British, 12% Other, 2% Irish) and 10% Indian. 39% was Christian and 19% Jewish. The most spoken foreign language is Gujarati followed by Persian and Romanian.

These data do not represent the other wards of Canons and Edgware in Harrow, the Burnt Oak ward in Barnet and the Queensbury ward in Brent.

Economy

Argonaut Games once had its head office in Edgware. They were in Argonaut House, now known as Cavendish House. The computer game Worms was designed there with Nigel Brownjohn as the lead graphic designer and contracts came from Nintendo.

Green Shield Stamps was also headquartered in Edgware until its closure in 1991. It occupied Premier House which was owned by the charity Erinastar Ltd under its then Trustee, Mr David Reichmann (Property Developer), who commenced its development in 2014 into 121 residential flats, now subject to dispute by current residents over the Grenfell type of cladding used in the development. Premier House residential is known as Premier Place.
Dick Turpin's Halt - The famous highwayman used to hold up unsuspecting travellers at the intersection of Whitchurch Lane (B461) into Station Road (A5100) across the Edgware Road (A5) in Edgware. An antique shop was there in the 1960s called Dick Turpins Halt and the black and white timber shop is still there today.

Media
Local news in Edgware is provided by the weekly printed or online boroughwide Times series.

Education

London Academy
Beit Shvidler Primary School
Holland House School
Broadfields Primary School
Deansbrook Primary School
Krishna Avanti Primary School, Harrow
North London Collegiate School
Rosh Pinah Primary School
Edgware Junior School
Canons High School

Transport

Tube 
Like most parts of northwest London, Edgware is served very well by the London Underground and there are four stations serving the area:

 (Northern line)
 (Northern line)
 (Jubilee line)
 (Jubilee line)

Buses

Fifteen day London Buses serve Edgware, along with three night services, three school services, and two non-TfL routes operated by Uno.

Sport
Edgware Cricket Club, based at Canons Park, play Sunday League cricket during the summer months. Edgware Town F.C. is a football club that represents Edgware, but they are currently based in Kingsbury.

Notable people

Nicolas Anelka — footballer, when playing for Arsenal
Anita Asante footballer
John Bercow — former Speaker of the House of Commons and MP for Buckingham
Boz Boorer — guitarist, producer, co-writer and musical director for Morrissey.
Eleanor Bron — actress
Max Bygraves — singer, comedian and actor
Paul Chowdhry — stand-up comedian
Antony Costa — singer from boy band Blue
Tony Currie — footballer
Sope Dirisu - Actor
Shirley Eaton — actress
Steve Ellis — a member of sixties pop group The Love Affair, born in Edgware 1950
Victor Feldman (1934-1984), jazz musician (1934-1984), was born in Edgware.
Vanessa Feltz — TV/radio presenter
Fenella Fielding (1927–2018) actress, lived in Edgware in her early life.
Dayan Michoel Fisher (1910–2004) — Former Chairman of the Federation of Synagogues Rabbinate
Dean Furman (born 1988) - professional footballer, grew up in Edgware.
George Frideric Handel (1685–1759) — composer
Altaf Hussain Chief and founder of Pakistan's MQM Party. Resident since 1992.
Charlotte McDonagh — actress/television presenter/model and singer
Patrick McGoohan (1928 –2009), lead actor in the 1967 series The Prisoner, lived in a large detached house on The Ridgeway, Mill Hill Village.
Jane March  — actress
Dave Mattacks — rock and folk drummer, best known for his work with Fairport Convention.
George Michael — pop singer
Barry Norman — television presenter and author
Archie Panjabi — Emmy Award winning actress, known for The Good Wife
David Piper - racing driver
Angharad Rees — actress
Richard Russell Owner of UK Record Label, XL Recordings
Pat Sharp — disc jockey and television presenter
Ben Strevens — footballer currently playing for Wycombe Wanderers
Mitchell Symons — journalist and author
Ernest George Trobridge — architect; Blue Plaque at 19 Heather Walk.
Patrick Vieira — former Arsenal footballer
William Wilberforce - (1759 – 1833), slave trade abolitionist, lived on the Highwood Hill estate, Mill Hill (1826-1831)
Frank Williams — actor, most notable role: the vicar in Dad's Army.
Christopher Wreh — former Arsenal footballer

Gallery

References

External links
Ward information
Barnet Archives and Local Studies
Victoria County History Edgware Chapter (1971)
1870s map 
Clive Smith  photo collection

 
Areas of London
Districts of the London Borough of Barnet
Places formerly in Middlesex
Major centres of London